Serge Roberge (born March 31, 1965) is a Canadian former professional ice hockey player who played nine games in the National Hockey League (NHL) with the Quebec Nordiques during the 1990–91 season. The rest of his career, which lasted from 1985 to 2005, was spent in various minor leagues. He is the brother of former NHL player Mario Roberge.

Career statistics

Regular season and playoffs

External links
 

1965 births
Living people
Canadian ice hockey right wingers
Cape Breton Oilers players
Cornwall Aces players
Drummondville Voltigeurs players
Fredericton Canadiens players
French Quebecers
Halifax Citadels players
Hull Olympiques players
Ice hockey people from Quebec City
Las Vegas Flash players
Mohawk Valley Prowlers players
Montreal Roadrunners players
Phoenix Mustangs players
Quebec Nordiques players
Quebec Rafales players
Quebec Remparts players
Rochester Americans players
Sherbrooke Canadiens players
Undrafted National Hockey League players
Utica Devils players
Virginia Lancers (ACHL) players